The Panaca Summit Archeological District, near Panaca, Nevada is a  area that was listed on the National Register of Historic Places in 1990.  It included 74 contributing sites.  Archeological sites are listed on the National Register for their potential to provide important information in the future.

Some of the sites were investigated in 1986–1987 in connection with a construction project that was to lay fiber optic cable through the area.

References

Geography of Lincoln County, Nevada
Archaeological sites on the National Register of Historic Places in Nevada
Historic districts on the National Register of Historic Places in Nevada
National Register of Historic Places in Lincoln County, Nevada